Tiberius Claudius Quartinus was a Roman senator active during the first half of the second century AD. Originally of the equestrian class, Quartinus was suffect consul during 130 as the colleague of Cassius Agrippa. Quartinus is known primarily from inscriptions.

Life 
An inscription from Lugdunum (now lost) provides details of his cursus honorum. Quartinus began his career in the emperor's service as an equestrian tribune with Legio III Cyrenaica, which was stationed at Bostra in Syria. He pleased the emperor Trajan, who adlected him in splendissimum ordinem, which, Ronald Syme explains, means that he was "given the latus clavus and he entered the Senate as quaestor urbanus". Syme also offers a possible reason for this honor: as tribune in III Cyrenaica, Quartinus participated in the Roman occupation of Arabia Petraea in the years 105/106.

Despite this honor, Quartinus' career was not rapid. After reaching the praetorship, he was legate to a proconsul of Asia, then juridicus in Hispania Tarraconensis, which duties we know he carried out in the years 117 and 119. During a period of strife with Parthia in 123, Quartinus was commander of a force composed of the legions II Traiana and III Cyrenaica, and their auxiliaries. He had to serve as governor of Gallia Lugdunensis before at last acceding to his consulate, over twenty years after he had been promoted to senatorial status. Werner Eck, in his list of senatorial office-holders for this period, cannot provide a more specific date for Quartinus' tenure in Lugdunensis than "between 123 and 130".

Following his consulate, Quartinus was admitted to the Septemviri epulonum, one of the four major priesthoods of ancient Rome. This collegium or priesthood was responsible for arranging feasts and public banquets at festivals and games (ludi). He was also assigned another office in the emperor's service, governor of Germania Superior, where a military diploma attests his presence in the province on 16 October 134. The last office Quartinus is known to have held was the proconsular governorship of Asia, at a date estimated by Géza Alföldy to be 144/145.

References 

2nd-century Romans
Quartinus, Tiberius Claudius
Roman governors of Gallia Lugdunensis
Suffect consuls of Imperial Rome
Roman governors of Germania Superior
Roman governors of Asia
Epulones of the Roman Empire